American Tragedy is a 2000 American television film broadcast on CBS from November 12, 2000, to November 15, 2000, that is based on the O. J. Simpson murder case for the 1994 murder of his ex-wife, Nicole Brown Simpson, and her friend, Ron Goldman. Ving Rhames starred as defense attorney Johnnie Cochran. It was directed by Lawrence Schiller, and the screenplay was adapted from Schiller's book, American Tragedy: The Uncensored Story of the Simpson Defense, by novelist Norman Mailer, who had previously collaborated with Schiller on The Executioner's Song. It was produced by Fox Television Studios. Mailer publicly criticized CBS for its promotion of the miniseries, which used ads that focused on the fact that Simpson tried unsuccessfully to have the courts block its broadcast. It won a Satellite Award and was nominated for a Golden Globe Award.

Cast

References

External links
 

2000 television films
2000 films
American courtroom films
American docudrama films
Films directed by Lawrence Schiller
O. J. Simpson murder case
Films with screenplays by Norman Mailer
2000 drama films
Films based on non-fiction books
20th Century Fox Television films
Films scored by Bill Conti
American drama television films
2000s English-language films
2000s American films